Margo is a brand of soap manufactured in India. The soap has neem as its main ingredient. The soap was created and  manufactured by the Calcutta Chemical Company under the stewardship of its founder, K.C. Das, khogen Chandra Das and was launched in 1920. In 1988, the soap was among the top five-selling brands in India, with a market share of 8.9%. As of 2001, the brand was worth 75 crores and belonged to Henkel-SPIC. As of 2003, the brand was relaunching new products focused on the younger demographic, and had a market share of close to 2% of the premium-soaps segment in India. In 2011, Jyothy Laboratories acquired the rights to the brand following the acquisition of controlling stake in Henkel India.

References

External links
 Margo official website

Products introduced in 1920
Indian soap brands